Albine is a commune of the Tarn department in southern France.

Geography
The Thoré forms the commune's northern border.

Population

Its inhabitants are called Albinols.

See also
Communes of the Tarn department

References

Communes of Tarn (department)